Kimberly Jean-Pierre is the Assembly member for the 11th District of the New York Assembly, which includes portions of the town of Babylon in Suffolk County. A Democrat, Jean-Pierre was first elected in 2014.

Jean-Pierre is of Haitian-American descent, and graduated from Brooklyn College and later received a master's degree in public policy from Stony Brook University. Prior to elected office Jean-Pierre worked for the Suffolk County Legislature as a legislative aide to DuWayne Gregory. She later worked for Congressman Steve Israel as a Community Outreach Coordinator, and later for the Town of Babylon's Industrial Development Agency.

In 2014, Assemblyman Robert Sweeney decided to retire, leaving the district open for the first time in twenty six years.  Jean-Pierre announced her run, and easily attained the nomination before going to win the election with 58% of the vote. She easily won reelection in 2016 and 2018. In the Assembly, Jean-Pierre serves as Chair of the Subcommittee on Banking in Underserved Communities.

Pierre resides in Wheatley Heights.

References

External links
The New York State Assembly: Kimberly Jean-Pierre (D-Wheatley Heights)

Living people
People from Suffolk County, New York
People from Babylon, New York
American politicians of Haitian descent
Democratic Party members of the New York State Assembly
Women state legislators in New York (state)
21st-century American politicians
21st-century American women politicians
20th-century Haitian people
1984 births